Hornostaivka may refer to several inhabited places in Ukraine:

 Hornostaivka, an urban-type settlement in Kherson Oblast
 Hornostaivka, Crimea, a village in Crimea
 Hornostaivka, Henichesk Raion, Kherson Oblast, a village in Henicheck Raion, Kherson Oblast
 Hornostaivka, Chernihiv Oblast, a village in Chernihiv Oblast